The 80th Flying Training Wing is a wing of the United States Air Force based out of Sheppard Air Force Base in Wichita Falls, Texas.

The 80th FTW is home of the Euro-NATO Joint Jet Pilot Training (ENJJPT) Program. ENJJPT, established in the spirit of the North Atlantic Treaty Organization (NATO), is the world's only multi-nationally manned and managed flying training program chartered to produce combat pilots for NATO.

Components
80th Operations Group (80 OG)
 The 80th OG provides operational support, flying training, air traffic control and evaluation of 256 student pilots and 110 instructor pilot candidates, as well as Introduction to Fighter Fundamentals for more than 145 trainees annually. The group oversees seven squadrons – 80th Operations Support Squadron, 88th Fighter Training Squadron, 89th Flying Training Squadron, 90th Flying Training Squadron, 97th Flying Training Squadron, 459th Flying Training Squadron, and 469th Flying Training Squadron – that train and support undergraduate pilots from NATO countries.

80th Operations Support Squadron (80 OSS)
88th Fighter Training Squadron (88 FTS) T-38C Talon
89th Flying Training Squadron (89 FTS) T-6A Texan II
90th Flying Training Squadron (90 FTS) T-38C Talon (Blue/Yellow tail stripe)
97th Flying Training Squadron (97 FTS)
459th Flying Training Squadron (459 FTS) T-6A Texan II
469th Flying Training Squadron (469 FTS) T-38C Talon (Green tail stripe)

History

World War II
The 80th Pursuit Group (Interceptor) was constituted on 13 January 1942 and activated in February 1942 under command of Rear Admiral Arron Reitcheck. It was redesignated as the 80th Fighter Group in May 1942. During World War II, the group was the first USAAF unit to be stationed in Burma after the Allied retreat in 1942. During its two years in combat, this group, which called itself the Burma Banshees, kept the supply lines open to China while clearing the way for Allied forces and US Army units such as Merrill's Marauders to sweep Japanese forces from northern Burma.

The 80th trained for combat and served as part of the defense force for the northeastern United States from, 1942–1943. It's flying squadrons were the 88th, 89th, and 90th Pursuit (later Fighter) Squadrons. It first trained with the P-47 Thunderbolt and later in the Curtis P-40.

The 80th sailed for India, via Brazil, the Cape of Good Hope, and Ceylon, in May 1943, commencing combat operations in the China-Burma-India theater in September 1943. The group supported Allied ground forces during the battle for northern Burma and the push southward to Rangoon, bombing and strafing troop concentrations, supply dumps, lines of communication, artillery positions, and other objectives.

The 80th was assigned the defense of the Indian terminus of the Hump route, which it carried out by striking Japanese airfields and patrolling Allied air bases to safeguard them from attack. The 80th received a Distinguished Unit Citation for intercepting a formation of Japanese aircraft, preventing the destruction of a large oil refinery in Assam, India, on 27 March 1944. Though its primary mission in Burma was the protection of the "Hump" cargo route, the group also played an important role in reopening the Ledo/Burma Road. Using modified, so-called B-40 fighter bombers (the Curtiss P-40 fitted with a 1,000-pound bomb), the 80th FG attacked Japanese-held bridges, sometimes demolishing their target with a single bomb. By the end of the war, the group had destroyed more than 200 bridges and killed scores of bridge repair crews. Air-to-air and air-to-ground sweeps by the group's pilots claimed 80 enemy planes destroyed in the air or on the ground.

The 80th Fighter Group was withdrawn from combat in May 1945 and inactivated in November.

Flying training
The 3630th Flying Training Wing was activated at Sheppard Air Force Base on 10 December 1965 to provide pilot training for the German Air Force.  It was discontinued and replaced by the 80th Flying Training Wing in 1972 as part of an Air Training Command program to replace its four-digit Major Command controlled wings with wings that had a combat lineage.   Since its reactivation, the wing has provided undergraduate pilot training, initially for USAF, German Air Force, and Republic of Vietnam Air Force students.

Although Republic of Vietnam Air Force pilot training ceased in September 1974, students from other nations continued to train under the security assistance program through April 1980. It also provided USAF rotary-wing pilots' conversion training to fixed-wing aircraft from June 1977 – November 1981. The wing has conducted pilot training and pilot instructor training under the Euro-NATO Joint Pilot Training Program, since October 1981, with participating nations contributing staff and financial support. In January 1994, the 80th began training Euro-NATO pilots in fighter fundamentals, using AT-38 aircraft.

Lineage
 80th Fighter Group
 Established as the 80 Pursuit Group (Interceptor) on 13 January 1942
 Activated on 9 February 1942
 Redesignated 80 Fighter Group (Single Engine) on 15 May 1942
 Inactivated on 3 November 1945
 Consolidated with the 80 Flying Training Wing as the 80 Flying Training Wing on 31 January 1984

 80th Flying Training Wing
 Established as the 80 Flying Training Wing on 23 May 1972
 Activated on 1 January 1973
 Consolidated with the 80 Fighter Group on 31 January 1984

 Assignments 

 III Interceptor Command (later III Fighter Command), 9 February 1942
 First Air Force, 20 June 1942
 I Fighter Command, 4 July 1942
 New York Air Defense Wing, 11 August 1942 – 10 May 1943
 Tenth Air Force, 28 June 1943
 American Air Command 1 (later 5320 Air Defense Wing [Provisional]), September 1943

 Tenth Air Force, 20 June 1944
 Army Air Forces, India-Burma Theater, c. 1 August-9 October 1945
 New York Port of Embarkation, 1–3 November 1945
 Air Training Command, 1 January 1973
 Nineteenth Air Force, 1 July 1993 – present

 Components Groups 80th Operations Group: 2 January 1998 – presentSquadrons'
 88 Pursuit Squadron (later 88 Fighter Squadron, 88 Flying Training Squadron): 9 February 1942 – 3 November 1945; 1 January 1973 – 2 January 1998.
 89th Pursuit Squadron (later 89 Fighter Squadron, 89 Flying Training Squadron): 9 February 1942 – 3 November 1945; 1 January 1973 – 2 January 1998.
 90 Pursuit Squadron (later 90 Fighter Squadron, 90 Flying Training Squadron): 9 February 1942 – 3 November 1945; 1 January 1973 – 2 January 1998.
 459 Fighter Squadron (later 459th Flying Training Squadron: 1 September 1943 – 5 November 1945, 17 April 2009 – present

Stations 

Selfridge Field, Michigan, 9 February 1942 – 5 July 1942
Farmingdale Army Air Field, New York 5 July 1942 – 9 March 1943
 Mitchel Field, New York, 9 March 1943 – 30 April 1943
 Karachi Airport, India, 28 June 1943 – October 1943
 Nagaghuli Airfield, India, October 1943 – 29 August 1944
 Tingkawk Sakan Airfield, Burma, 29 August 1944 – 20 January 1945

 Myitkyina Airfield, Burma, 20 January 1945 – 24 May 1945
 Dudhkundi Airfield, India, 24 May 1945 – 6 October 1945
Camp Kilmer, New Jersey, 1 – 3 November 1945
Sheppard Air Force Base, Texas, 1 January 1973 – present

Aircraft operated 

Republic P-47 Thunderbolt (1942–1945)
Curtiss P-40 Warhawk (1943–1944)
P-38 Lightning (1943–1944)
Cessna T-37 Tweet (1973–2009)

Northrop T-38 Talon (1973 – present)
 Northrop AT-38B Talon (1993–2006)
T-6A Texan II (2008 – present)

References

Notes

Citations

Bibliography

 
 

Military units and formations in Texas
0080
Military units and formations established in 1972